There were three formations known as the Army of Mississippi in the Confederate States Army during the American Civil War. This name is contrasted against Army of the Mississippi, which was a Union Army named for the Mississippi River, not the state of Mississippi.

Army of Mississippi (March 1862)
This army, at times known by the name Army of the West was one of the most important in the Western Theater, fighting at Shiloh, Corinth, and Perryville. It was organized on March 5, 1862, and portions of the Army of Pensacola were added on March 13. It was consolidated with the Army of Central Kentucky and the Army of Louisiana on March 29. On November 20, 1862, it was renamed the Army of Tennessee.

Command history

Army of Mississippi (December 1862)
The second army was referred to as the Army of Vicksburg. It was organized December 7, 1862, by troops in the Department of Mississippi and East Louisiana, including the short-lived Army of West Tennessee. Its sole function was to defend Vicksburg, Mississippi, on the Mississippi River and it ceased to exist when southern Gen. John C. Pemberton surrendered it after a long offensive campaign and siege to Maj. Gen. Ulysses S. Grant on July 4, 1863, opening up the "Father of Waters" to Union control and splitting the Confederacy in two.

Command history

Army of Mississippi (1863–64)
The third army was retitled III Corps, Army of Tennessee, around May 4, 1864, but it continued to use the former name.

Command history

References
 Eicher, John H., & Eicher, David J., Civil War High Commands, Stanford University Press, 2001, .

1862 establishments in the Confederate States of America
Mississippi
Georgia (U.S. state) in the American Civil War
Kentucky in the American Civil War
Mississippi in the American Civil War
Tennessee in the American Civil War